Three Hearts is a 2014 French drama film directed by Benoît Jacquot and co-written with Julien Boivent. The film stars Benoît Poelvoorde, Charlotte Gainsbourg, Chiara Mastroianni and Catherine Deneuve. It was selected to compete for the Golden Lion at the 71st Venice International Film Festival. It was screened in the Special Presentations section of the 2014 Toronto International Film Festival. In January 2015, the film received four nominations at the 20th Lumières Awards.

Synopsis
After missing a train, Marc meets and falls in love with Sylvie. They agree to meet in Paris at the Jardin des Tuileries without exchanging contact information. On the time of the rendezvous, Marc is held up in a meeting and they miss each other. Disappointed, Sylvie moves to the USA with her husband. Later, Marc meets Sylvie's sister Sophie and they fall in love. As Marc and Sophie's relationship becomes serious, he discovers she is Sylvie's sister.

Cast 
 Benoît Poelvoorde as Marc Beaulieu 
 Charlotte Gainsbourg as Sylvie Berger
 Chiara Mastroianni as Sophie Berger
 Catherine Deneuve as Madame Berger
 André Marcon as Castang
 Patrick Mille as Sylvie's husband
 Thomas Doret as Gabriel 
 Anne Consigny as The cardiologist

Production
Three Hearts is produced by Edouard Weil and Alice Girard for Rectangle Productions, with co-production support from Pandora Film, Scope Pictures and Arte France Cinéma. The film was pre-acquired by Canal+ and Ciné+ and will be distributed by Wild Bunch in France.

Filming began on 16 September 2013 in the Île-de-France region and was completed in 45 days.

Critical response
On review aggregator website Rotten Tomatoes, Three Hearts has an approval rating of 81%, based on 36 reviews, with an average rating of 6.8/10. On Metacritic, which assigns a normalized rating, the film has a score of 56 out of 100, based on 19 critics, indicating "mixed or average reviews".

Accolades

References

External links 
 

2014 films
2010s French-language films
2014 drama films
French drama films
Films shot in France
Films directed by Benoît Jacquot
Films scored by Bruno Coulais
2010s French films